The East Amwell Township School District is a community public school district that serves students in pre-kindergarten through eighth grade from East Amwell Township, in Hunterdon County, New Jersey, United States.

As of the 2018–19 school year, the district, comprising one school, had an enrollment of 355 students and 37.8 classroom teachers (on an FTE basis), for a student–teacher ratio of 9.4:1.

The district is classified by the New Jersey Department of Education as being in District Factor Group "I", the second-highest of eight groupings. District Factor Groups organize districts statewide to allow comparison by common socioeconomic characteristics of the local districts. From lowest socioeconomic status to highest, the categories are A, B, CD, DE, FG, GH, I and J.

Public school students in ninth through twelfth grades attend Hunterdon Central High School, part of the Hunterdon Central Regional High School District in central Hunterdon County, which also serves students from Delaware Township, Flemington Borough, Raritan Township and Readington Township. As of the 2018–19 school year, the high school had an enrollment of 2,844 students and 238.8 classroom teachers (on an FTE basis), for a student–teacher ratio of 11.9:1.

School
East Amwell Township School had an enrollment of 359 students as of the 2018–19 school year. 
John Capuano, Principal

Administration
Core members of the district's administration are:
Edward Stoloski, Superintendent
Heidi Gara, Board Secretary / Business Administrator

Board of education
The district's board of education, with nine members, sets policy and oversees the fiscal and educational operation of the district through its administration. As a Type II school district, the board's trustees are elected directly by voters to serve three-year terms of office on a staggered basis, with three seats up for election each year held (since 2013) as part of the November general election.

References

External links
East Amwell Township School
 
School Data for the East Amwell Township School, National Center for Education Statistics
Hunterdon Central Regional High School District

East Amwell Township, New Jersey
New Jersey District Factor Group I
School districts in Hunterdon County, New Jersey
Public K–8 schools in New Jersey